Konrad Cunha Dantas (born 13 September 1988), better known by the stage name KondZilla, or just KOND, is a Brazilian screenwriter and director. He is the founder of KondZilla Records, which is a music video production company and record label often credited for being the main popularizer of funk ostentação. He currently owns the largest YouTube channel in Brazil and Latin America, and the third largest music channel in the world, with 65.9 million subscribers and 36.5 billion views. In addition to his music videos, he is also the creator and director of the Netflix drama Sintonia.

Among the artists who have worked with KondZilla are funk, rock bands and rap artists such as: MC Guimê, DJ Marlboro, Mr. Catra, Charlie Brown Jr., Karol Conka, Racionais MC's, and Aloe Blacc.

Early life 
Konrad Dantas was born in the city of Guarujá, São Paulo. His mother was a teacher and his father worked as a bricklayer. When he was 18 years old, he worked as a web designer at a university in Santos, São Paulo. At 18, his mother died, leaving him a sizable life insurance. He used some of this money to buy a Canon EOS 5D camera to pursue a career in video production. Dantas later moved to the city of  São Paulo, where he studied cinematography, post-production and photography.

Career
In 2017, KondZilla Records was integrated into Dantas's production company, which has existed since 2011. The label manages the career of artists such as MC Kevinho, MC Kekel, MC Guimê, MC Dede, Dani Russo, Mc Rodolfinho, Mc Mm; and launches their music videos on his channel.

KondZilla has produced more than 1000 music videos, and his YouTube channel has more than 50 million subscribers, which is almost half of the unique users of YouTube in Brazil and 22 percent of the Brazilian population. He also has more than 25 billion views on his YouTube channel. On 3 February 2018, he surpassed Whindersson Nunes, making him the largest Brazilian channel on YouTube by subscriber count.

KondZilla also directed the DVDs Música Popular Caiçara by rock band Charlie Brown Jr. and Imagination by MC Boy of Charmes.

See also
 List of YouTubers

References 

Brazilian music video directors
Brazilian screenwriters
Brazilian television producers
Living people
People from Guarujá
Brazilian YouTubers
1988 births
Music YouTubers
21st-century screenwriters